Chen Dong (born 12 December 1978) is a Chinese fighter pilot and taikonaut selected as part of the Shenzhou program. A fighter pilot in the People's Liberation Army Air Force, he was selected to be a CNSA taikonaut in 2010.

In December 2022, he set a new record for longest stay in space by a Chinese astronaut with a cumulative 214 days in space.

Early life and education
Chen was born in Luoyang, Henan, on 12 December 1978 from a working-class family.

He holds a master's degree in engineering from Xi'an Jiaotong University.

Military career
He joined the People's Liberation Army Air Force in August 1997, achieving the rank of Colonel. He was further promoted to the rank Senior Colonel.

Astronaut career
Chen was selected for the second batch for Chinese astronauts in 2009 when he was a combat aircraft pilot. He was interviewed by Yang Liwei.

Shenzhou 11
He was selected to fly on the Shenzhou 11 mission in October 2016 with astronaut Jing Haipeng. The two underwent more than 3,000 hours of training before the launch of the spacecraft. On 17 October 2016 On 07:30 local time (23:30 GMT on 16 October), Chen lifted off with Shenzhou 11 for a 33-day space mission to the Tiangong-2 space station as his first spaceflight, launched from the Jiuquan Satellite Launch Center using a Long March 2F launch rocket. The crew landed successfully after the 33 day mission on 18 November 2016, marking China's longest manned space flight to date. The reentry module of the Shenzhou-11 spacecraft landed in Inner Mongolia around 2.15 p.m(China time) after detaching from the space lab on 17 November.

Shenzhou 14
On June 5, 2022, Chen launched about aboard Shenzhou 14 to the Tiangong space station for a mission and stay to last about 6 months. He has completed three spacewalks during the mission.

Awards 
For his achievements on the Shenzhou 11 mission, Chen was awarded the Spaceflight Merit Medal (Third Class) along with the honorary title of "hero astronaut" on 26 December 2016 by the Central Military Commission.

Personal life
Chen is married and has twin sons.

See also
 List of Chinese astronauts
 Chinese space programme

References

External links
 biography of Chendong

 

1978 births
Living people
People from Luoyang
People's Liberation Army Astronaut Corps
Shenzhou program astronauts
People's Liberation Army Air Force personnel
Spacewalkers